Tri-Lakes is an area of Colorado in the United States consisting of Monument Lake in Monument, Palmer Lake in Palmer Lake, and Lake Woodmoor in Woodmoor. Those three communities are adjacent to one another and together comprise a population estimated at 18,000 in 1996. They are all served by the Lewis-Palmer School District.

References

Populated places in Colorado